Terence William Buck (6 July 1943 – 7 March 2005) was an Australian swimmer and coach. He represented Australia at the 1964 Summer Olympics in the 400m individual medley and placed eighth. He was the first Australian swimmer to first participate at the Olympics as both an athlete and a coach. He was head coach in the 1984 Summer Olympics, and team manager in 1992 and 1996. Buck was also a surf lifesaver and a life member of the Clovelly Surf Club in New South Wales. He died in a tractor accident on his farm, leaving behind his wife Laraine and three daughters.

References

1943 births
2005 deaths
Olympic swimmers of Australia
Swimmers at the 1964 Summer Olympics
Australian swimming coaches
Accidental deaths in New South Wales
Farming accident deaths
20th-century Australian people